M'Pessoba is a small town and commune in the Cercle of Koutiala in the Sikasso Region of southern Mali. The commune covers an area of 490 square kilometers and includes 19 settlements. In the 2009 census it had a population of 36,297. The town of M'Pessoba, the administrative centre (chef-lieu) of the commune, is 40 km northwest of Koutiala.

References

External links
.

Communes of Sikasso Region